Dromoland Castle  is a castle, located near Newmarket-on-Fergus in County Clare, Ireland. It is operated as a five-star luxury hotel with a golf course, with its restaurant, the "Earl of Thomond", being awarded a Michelin star in 1995, under head chef Jean Baptiste Molinari.

Hotel 
Dromoland Castle was bought by United States citizen Bernard P. McDonough in 1962. It has since then been converted for use as a luxury hotel.

Dromoland Castle Hotel is a member of Historic Hotels Worldwide.

Famous guests 

United States President George W. Bush spent the night of Friday, 26 June 2004, at Dromoland Castle to attend the EU-US Summit held at the facility.  President Bush was guarded by approximately 7,000 police, military and private security forces during his 16-hour visit.

Over the years, guests who have stayed at Dromoland Castle include Muhammad Ali, Bono, Richard Branson, Juan Carlos I of Spain,  Johnny Cash, Bill Clinton, Michael Flatley, Nelson Mandela, Jack Nicholson,Rob and Katie Williams and John Travolta.

External links 
 Official site

References 

Castles in County Clare
Hotels in County Clare
O'Brien dynasty
Michelin Guide starred restaurants in Ireland